Warth v. Seldin, 422 U.S. 490 (1975), was a United States Supreme Court case in which the Court reviewed the concept of judicial standing and affirmed that if the plaintiffs lacked standing,  they could not maintain a case against the defendants.

Background 
The plaintiffs brought action against the town of Penfield, New York, a suburb of  Rochester, and against members of the Zoning, Planning, and Town Boards of Penfield, alleging that Penfield's zoning ordinances intentionally and wrongly excluded persons of low and moderate income from living there.  

The not-for-profit housing organization Metro-Act of Rochester joined with several Rochester taxpayers as well as low and moderate-income individuals of various racial and ethnic backgrounds were considered jointly as party-plaintiffs to this action. However, the  United States District Court dismissed the case, citing that the plaintiffs did not have standing to sue. The United States Court of Appeals affirmed the dismissal.

The court was tasked to determine if the American rules of standing should be considered part of the 'case or controversy' clause of Article Three of the United States Constitution or, apart from that, if the court can hear cases on "generalized grievances" or in the interest of third parties where none of the complainants have standing.

Opinion of the Court 
The Court found that as none of the plaintiffs could demonstrate any injury actually done to them by the defendants,  the plaintiffs were third parties to the issue and had no standing to sue.   The plaintiff's descriptions of their own meager financial situations and subsequent inability to live in Penfield were found by the Court to be the consequence of the economics and housing market of the area rather than any wrongdoing by the defendants.

External links
 
 
 Case or Controversy Requirement of Article III

United States Constitution Article Three case law
United States Supreme Court cases
1975 in United States case law
United States Supreme Court cases of the Burger Court
United States standing case law